HMS Tarpon was a Royal Navy R-class destroyer constructed and operational in the First World War. She is named after the large fish Tarpon; one species of which is native to the Atlantic, and the other to the Indo-Pacific Oceans. Tarpon was built by the shipbuilders John Brown & Company at their Clydebank shipyard and was launched in March 1917 and entered service in April that year.

Tarpon served as a minelayer through the remainder of the First World War, and operated in the Baltic during the Russian Civil War. After a period attached to the Torpedo School at Portsmouth, where she was used for training and experimental purposes, Tarpon was sold for scrap in 1927.

Construction
The R-class was a further development of the M-class destroyer, which had been the last class of destroyers ordered for the Royal Navy before the start of the First World War, and had therefore been built in large numbers during the early years of the war.  The R-class differed by having geared rather than direct drive steam turbines, giving greater fuel efficiency, having a higher forecastle for better seakeeping and a larger and more robust bridge structure.

Tarpon was ordered from John Brown & Company by the British Admiralty in March 1916 as part of the Eighth War Construction Programme. The ship was laid down at John Brown's Clydebank shipyard on 12 April 1916. On 10 February 1917, while Tarpon was still under construction, it was decided to modify the destroyer for use as a minelayer. She was launched on 10 March 1917 and completed in April that year.

Armament consisted of three QF 4in Mk IV guns on the ship's centreline, with one on the forecastle, one aft on a raised bandstand and one between the second and third funnels. A single 2-pounder (40 mm) pom-pom anti-aircraft gun was fitted, while torpedo armament consisted of four 21 inch (533 mm) torpedoes in two twin mounts. As converted to a minelayer, Tarpons aft gun and one of the pairs of torpedo-tubes could be removed to accommodate about 40 mines to be carried. The armament could be re-instated in about 12 hours to allow operation as a normal destroyer. The ship had a complement of 82 officers and men.

Service
In May 1917 the destroyer was assigned to the 13th Destroyer Flotilla of the Grand Fleet, based at Rosyth and combining support to the Battlecruiser force with minelaying operations. On the night of 13/14 June 1917, Tarpon, together with the light cruiser  and the destroyer leader , together with a close escort of four destroyers and a more distant screening force of three more destroyers and two light cruisers, laid a minefield of 195 mines in the Heligoland Bight. On the return journey, Tarpon struck a mine, badly damaging her stern, and had to be towed back to Dunkirk by Thruster. This minefield may have caused the loss of the German submarine UC-1, which failed to return from a mission to lay mines off Calais, departing Zeebrugge on 18 July and was due back on 20 July.

Tarpon was under repair for several months, and then joined the recently established 20th Destroyer Flotilla based on the Humber, which had the principal role of minelaying, particularly in the Helgoland Bight. She is listed in the Navy List as being part of the 20th Flotilla in March 1918, but did not carry out another minelaying operation until the night of 21/22 April, when Tarpon, Telemachus, Abdiel,  and  laid 318 mines.  On 15 May 1918, Tarpon, together with Abdiel, Telemachus, Ariel,  and Sandfly were on their way to lay a minefield when they ran into thick fog. Telemachus collided with Sandfly and Tarpon with Ariel. While Telemachus, Tarpon and Ariel sustained little damage, Sandfly was holed in the engine room, and had to be towed back to England by Ferret, escorted by Telemachus. Venturous lost touch with the formation, so in the end, only Tarpon, Abdiel and Ariel succeeded in laying a total of 152 mines. Tarpon was refitted in late June 1918.

The 20th Flotilla, including Tarpon, was carrying another minelaying operation on the night of 2–3 August 1918 when the destroyer  struck a mine, blowing off her bow, quickly followed by Ariel, which soon sank. It proved impossible to salvage Vehement, which was scuttled using gunfire and depth charges. These losses were as a result of German defensive minefields in the Bight, which resulted in a reduction of British minelaying activities there, but the 20th Flotilla, including Tarpon continued to be active through to the end of the war. Tarpon laid a total of 1425 mines during the war.

The 20th Flotilla was deployed to the Baltic at the end of June 1919, providing minelaying support to the British intervention in the Russian Civil War. Tarpon remained part of the 20th Flotilla in October 1919, and was at Riga in Latvia in October 1919. The 20th Flotilla sailed from the Baltic for Britain on 25 October. By December 1919, Tarpon was listed as attached to the 2nd Flotilla of the Atlantic Fleet. She was re-commissioned on 1 February 1920 as a tender to HMS Vernon, the Torpedo School at Portsmouth. Tarpon remained part of Vernon in 1925, being used for experimental work on mine warfare, including tests of high speed sweeps for minesweeping and testing the behaviour of depth charges when used against deep diving submarines, as well as regular training activities as part of the school.

Tarpon was sold for scrap to Cashmore's of Newport on 4 August 1927.

Pennant numbers

Footnotes

References

Citations

Bibliography

External links
 HMS Tarpon at 'The Dreadnought Project'

World War I destroyers of the United Kingdom
R-class destroyers (1916)
1917 ships